Prabodh Chandra Dey  (May 1, 1919 − October 24, 2013), known by his stage name Manna Dey, was an internationally acclaimed and celebrated Indian playback singer, music director, and a musician. As a classical vocalist, he belonged to the Bhendibazaar Gharana and was trained under Ustad Aman Ali Khan. He is considered one of the most versatile and celebrated vocalists of the Hindi film industry, often credited with the success of Indian classical music in Hindi commercial movies. As a musician, Dey is best known for infusing Indian classical music in a pop framework that ushered the golden period in Hindi cinema.

In a career spanning over five decades, Dey recorded total 3,047 songs, though most primarily in Bengali and Hindi; Dey also sang in 14 other Indian languages, including Bhojpuri, Punjabi, Assamese, Gujarati, Kannada, Malayalam, and Chhattisgarhi. The mid-50s to 70s were considered the peak of his musical career.

The Government of India honored him with the Padma Shri in 1971, the Padma Bhushan in 2005  and the Dadasaheb Phalke Award in 2007.<ref>Manna Dey: Manna Dey archive in a shambles | Kolkata News – The Times of India . The Times of India. (25 October 2016). Retrieved 6 November 2018.'</ref>

Early life
Dey was born in a Bengali family to Mahamaya and Purna Chandra Dey on 1 May 1919 in Calcutta (Now Kolkata). Besides his parents, his youngest paternal uncle, Sangeetacharya Krishna Chandra Dey highly inspired and influenced him. He received his early education at Indu Babur Pathshala, a small pre-primary school. He started doing stage shows in school from 1929. He attended Scottish Church Collegiate School and Scottish Church College. He participated in sports events like wrestling and boxing in his college days, taking training from Gobar Guha. He graduated from Vidyasagar College.

Dey began taking music lessons from Krishna Chandra Dey and Ustad Dabir Khan. During this period of learning, he stood first for three consecutive years in three different categories of inter-collegiate singing competitions.

Career

Early career (1942–1953)
In 1942, Dey accompanied Krishna Chandra Dey on a visit to Bombay. There he started working as an assistant music director first under Krishna Chandra Dey in a Bengali film Chanakya in 1939 and then under Sachin Dev Burman. Later, he assisted other music composers and then started to work independently. While working independently as a music director for various Hindi movies, Dey continued to take musical lessons in Hindustani classical music from Ustad Aman Ali Khan and Ustad Abdul Rahman Khan. He often works with near about 185 music directors in his singing career in Bollywood.

Dey started his career in playback singing with the movie Tamanna, in 1942. The musical score was by Krishna Chandra Dey and Manna sang a duet named "Jago Aayee Usha Ponchi Boley Jago" with Suraiya which was an instant hit.

But it was only in 1943 that he got his first solo break with Ram Rajya. Incidentally, the producer of the film Vijay Bhatt and its composer Shankar Rao Vyas had approached K C Dey with an offer for playback in the film. When K C Dey refused the offer on the grounds that he would not lend his voice to other actors, they spotted Manna Dey sitting in the corner of the room and offered him the opportunity.

Shankar Rao Vyas taught Manna Dey the songs and he chose to sing them in his uncle's distinct style. And thus started the illustrious career with the first song "Gayi tu gayi Seeta sati"(Ram Rajya, 1943).

His songs like "O Prem Diwani Sambhal Ke Chalna" from 1944 film Kadambari composed by Anil Biswas, "Dil Churaney Ki Liye from Dur Chaley" (1946) composed by Jafar Khurshid, his duets with Amira Bahee like "E Diniya Jara Suney" from Kamala (1946) and duet song "Aaj Bor Aayee" with Meena Kapoor from 1947 film Chaltey Chaltey became chartbusters in respective years. Between 1945 and 1947, many Dey-Rajkumari duets like "Hay Gagan Me Badal Tharey" in 1945 for the film Vikaramaditya, "Aowji Morey" from Insaaf (1946), all four duets from the film Geet Govind composed by Pandit Indra – "Kit Ho Nando Kumar", "Chorr Sakhi Aaj Laj", "Apney Hi Rang", "Lalit Labang Lata" from Geet Govind became popular.

He sang for first time songs composed by Sachin Dev Burman, Upar Gagan Vishal and Duniya Ke Logo in the 1950 movie Mashal, which became popular and from here his association with S.D.Burman began. Its lyrics were written by Kavi Pradeep. In 1952, Dey sang for a Bengali and a Marathi movie with the same name and storyline, Amar Bhupali. This established him as a leading playback singer in Bengali films and Marathi films as well by 1953.

In the post independence period, after 1947, Dey was regularly used by music composers Anil Biswas, Shankar Rao Vyas, S.K.Pal, S.D.Burman, Khem Chand Prakash, Mohd.Safi from 1947 to 1957. Dey-Anil Biswas combination gave hit numbers from films like Gajre (1948), Hum Bhi Insaan Hai (1948), Do Sitaare (1951), Hamdard (1953), Mahatma Kabir (1954), Jasoos (1957) and Pardesi (1957). Though Anil Biswas worked with Dey in very few films, their songs remain famous. He recorded his first duet with Shamshad Begum, who was the Hindi female singer most in demand from 1940 to 1961, "Phoolon Ka Swapna" in the films Girls School (1949) composed by S.K.Pal.

His first duet with the then upcoming singer Lata Mangeshkar was "Lapat Ke Pot Pahaney Bikral" composed by Vasant Desai for Narsingh Avtar (1949), and with Kishore Kumar it was "Subaho Ki Paheli Kiran" from 1951 film Anadolan composed by Pannalal Ghosh. His first duet with Geeta Dutt was "Dhonyo Dhonyo He Ayodh Puri" from the film Ram Vivah (1949) composed by Shankar Rao Vyas, first duet with Umadevi (Tun Tun) was "Hay Ye Hain" from Jangal Ka Jaanwar (1951) composed by Ghantshala. His first duet with the then struggling singer Asha Bhosle was "O Raat Gayee Fir Din Aya" from 1953 film Bootpolish.

Dey established his verstality between 1948 and 1954 by singing not only the classical based film songs but also singing such film songs which were fusion of Indian classical music and pop music and by giving classical music concerts. His experimentation with western music too produced many unforgettable melodies resulting in an increase in singing offers in films from 1955. He began singing ghazals in Hindi films from 1953. He became a music composer in Hindi films when he composed music along with Khemchand Prakash for both Shri Ganesh Janma (1951) and Vishwamitra (1952).

1953–1967

By 1954, Dey became popular among musical circle across film industries of various Indian languages. He became nationally famous after release of Do Bigha Zamin (1953) where two of the songs sung by him and composed by Salil Choudhury became hits. Salil Choudhury worked with Dey from 1953 to 1992 in Hindi films and made Dey sing even in Bengali and Malayalam films right from the late 1950s to early 1990s. His association with Shankar–Jaikishan and producer Raj Kapoor had begun while working for Awara, but their combination became famous while working together for Boot Polish in 1954. The trio worked in many films together from 1954 to 1971 whose musical scores were appreciated, irrespective of their box-office fate, like Shree 420, Chori Chori, Mera Naam Joker, Awaara, and Kal Aaj Aur Kal. He also sang for Raj Kapoor in Parvarish, Sriman Satyavadi (both with music by Dattaram), Dil Hi To Hai (music by Roshan), and Abdullah (music by R.D. Burman). The Raj Kapoor-Manna Dey combination produced superhits (both music and film, the only exception being Mera Naam Joker where the songs were chartbusters but the film was a flop) and was a pair to reckon with. While Mukesh sang the slow pathos for Raj Kapoor, Dey sang the fast peppy ones, the classical numbers, the romantic duets (in case one analyses Dey has sung more than 95% of Raj Kapoor's superhit duets) and the naughty numbers. Dey has the rare distinction of doing playback for both father and son – Raj Kapoor and Randhir Kapoor (In fact Dey later sang for Rishi Kapoor in Zamane ko dikhana hai). C. Ramchandra worked with Dey very first time in Insaniyaat in 1955 and then recorded songs with Dey consistently even in the 1960s in films like – Tallaq (1959), Navrang, Paigham, Stree (1961), Veer Bhimsen etc.

In 1956, he sang with a new batch of singers. He recorded his first duets with Sudha Malhotra "Ghar Ghar Deep Jalao Re" from Ayodhyapati in 1956, with Binata Chatterjee in the duet "Tum Mile Mil Gaye Karaar" from Grand Hotel (1956) composed by Suresh Talwar, and then his first duet with Sabita Banerjee in the song "Jamine Hamari Jamana" composed by A.R.Quereshi from Laal-E-Yaman (1956) and with singer Meena Kapoor in the song "Rim Jhim Jhim Rim Jhim" from Pardesi (1957) composed by Anil Biswas.

Dey turned into an independent music composer in Hindi films with Maha Poojaa in 1954. He sang eighty-three Hindi songs in three years from 1953 to 1955 and his demand increased such that he sang 45 songs in the year 1956. His career reached in peak form when he recorded 95 Hindi songs in single year 1957 and 64 in 1958. His peak period in Hindi film industry is considered to be from 1953 to 1969 where he recorded 758 Hindi songs of which 631 came between 1957 and 1969. He worked extensively with other music directors like Naushad, K.Dutta, Vasant Pawar & Ram, Vasant Desai, Ravi, S.K.Pal, Avinash Vyas, S. N. Tripathi, Sanmukh Babu, Nissar Bazmi, Husanlal Bhagatram, B.N. Bali, Sushanta Banerjee, O.P. Nayyar, G.Ramanathan, T.G.Lingappa, Nirmal Kumar, Ghulam Mohhammed, Bipin Dutta, Rabin Banerjee, Roshan, Sapan Jagmohan from 1954 to 1968.

New age composers like Kalyanji-Anandji started recording songs with Dey from 1958 and Laxmikant Pyarelal from 1964. Rahul Dev Burman made Dey sing the westernised songs – "Aao Twist Karen" and "Pyar Karta Ja" which became chartbusters in 1965. But the composers who gave Dey consistent popular song numbers in commercially successful films from 1955 to 1969 were S.D.Burman, C.Ramachandra, Ravi, Avinash Vyas, Vasant Desai, Anil Biswas, Salil Choudhury and Shankar Jaikishan. The solo songs sung by Dey like "Lapak Jhapak Tu Aa Re" from Boot Polish (1954), "O Gori Tori Tu Pyar Ka Sagar Hai" from Seema (1955), "Yeh Kahani Hai Diye Aur Toofan Ki" from Diya Aur Toofan (1956) composed by Vasant Desai, "Humdum Se Gaye" from Manzil (1960), "Aye Mere Pyare Watan" from Kabuliwala (1961), "Laga Chunari Mein Daag" from Dil Hi Toh Hai (1963), classical songs like "Sur Na Saje" from Basant Bahar (1956), "Kaun Aya Mere Mann" from Dekh Kabira Roya (1957), "Pucho Na Kaise Maine Rain" from Meri Surat Teri Aankhen (1963), "Jhanak Jhanak Tore Baje Payalia" from Mere Huzoor (1965); folk based songs like "Kisi Chilman Se" from Baat Ek Raat Ki (1962), "Ae Meri Zohra Jabeen" from Waqt (1965), "Chalat Musafir Moh Liya" from Teesri Kasam (1967), "Aao Aao Sawariya", and duets with Lata like "Masti Bhara Yeh Sama" from Parvarish (1958), "Nain Mile Chain Kahan" from Basant Bahar(1956), "Kehdoji Kehdo Chupaona Pyar" from Kismat Ka Khel (1956), "Tum Gagan Ke Chandrama" from Sati Savitri (1964), "Dil Ki Girah" from Raat Aur Din (1966), "Chunari Sambhal Gori" from Baharon Ke Sapne (1967), were chartbusters in their respective year of release. Credit is also given to Dey for popularising classical based solo and duet songs to the masses like the duet with Lata – "Pritam Daras Dikhao" from Chacha Zindabad (1959), became a popular song though it was based on classical Raag Lalit. His rendition of "Kasame Vaade Pyar" from Upkar (1967) pictured on Pran and composed by Kalyanji Anandji won accolades for Dey, and was also significant in Pran's career as he began to do positive roles.

Dey gave playback for Raj Kapoor in Shree 420 (Mud Mud Ke Na Dekh), Chori Chori (Yeh Raat Bheegi, Jahan Main Jati and Aja Sanam), Parvarish (Masti bhara hai sama), Dil Hi To Hai (Laga chunari mein daag), Mera Naam Joker (Ae bhai zara dekh ke chalo) and "Ek Paon Chal Raha Hai" from Kal Aaj Aur Kal (1971). R.D.Burman recorded hit songs with Dey regularly from 1965 with films like Bhoot Bangla, Gomti Ke Kinare, Chandan Ka Palna, Baharon Ke Sapne, Padosan, in late 60s. He sang for Balraj Sahni in many films from 1950 till 1969 and was voice of Mehmood and Anoop Kumar in many films from 1960 to 1975.

Among the new breed of singers which emerged after 1956, Dey's duets with Suman Kalyanpur were popular making them a celebrated team. Their first duet was "Prem Bada Balwan Jagat" from Maayaa Nagri (1957) composed by B.N.Bali and since then have sung around 45 songs together. Their popular duets include "Tum Jo Aao" from Sakhi Robin (1962) composed by Robin Bannerjee, "Dil Se Jo Baat" from Al Hilal (1958) composed by C.Ramachandra, "Na Jane Kahan" from Zindagi Aur Khwab (1963), "Ye Din Hai Khushi Ke" from Jab Se Tumhe Dekha Hai (1963) and "Bheegi Hawaon Mein" from Shriman Sataywadi (1960)- all 3 composed by Dattaram Wadkar, "Aankh Mein Shokhi" from Reshmi Roomal (1960) composed by Babul, "Aao Hilmil Ke Nacho Re" from Jaane Anjaane (1970) composed by Shankar–Jaikishan and "Dil To Dil Hain Phool Bhi" from Dafaa 302 (1975) composed by Laxmikant Pyarelal.

Dey recorded popular duets with Mohd. Rafi, Dey sang 101 Hindi songs along with Rafi which include 58 duets with Rafi such as "Ishq Ishq" (Barsaat Ki Raat) "Tu hai mera prem Devta" (Kalpana), "Mama o mama" (Parvarish), Duniyaan ke liye from Maan Gaye Ustaad (1981), "Main Hoon Tera Prem Aur Tu Ho Meri Pran" from Rahu Ketu (1979), the song "Hindustan Ki Kasam" from Hindustan Ki Kasam (1973), "Hum To Tere Hai Deewane" from Johar Mehmood in Hong Kong, "Badey Miya Diwane" from Shagird, "Ye Do Diwane Dil Ke" from Johar Mehmood in Goa, "Agar Dil Dil Se" from Shola Aur Shabnam (1961).

With Asha Bhosle, recorded around 160 Hindi songs from 1953 to 1982 though their duets kept releasing till 1986 and their last song sung together was in Teri Maang Sitaaron Se Bhar Doon (1982). Popular duets of Asha-Dey include "Ye Hawa Yeh Nadi Ka" from Ghar Sansar (1958), "Tu chupi hai kahan" from Navrang (1959), "Jodi Hamari Jamegi" from Aulad (1968), "Sanjh Dhali Dil Ki Lagi" from Kala Bazar (1960), "Aye Kash Chalte Milte" from Manzil (1960), "Na Tohh karvan Ki Talaash Hai" from Barsaat Ki Raat (1960), "Jane Na Doonga" from Dadimaa (1966), "Re man sur me ga" from Lal Patthar (1971), "Zindegi hai khel" from Seeta Aur Geeta (1972) and "Paisa Daulat" from Dharkan (1972). Dey sang around 27 Hindi duets with Geeta Dutt from 1949 with the last being from Ziddi in 1964. The popular duets of Geeta Dutt-Dey include both classical songs as well as those which have style of Twist dance, Rock & Roll, cha-cha-cha like "Aan aan milo" from Devdas, :O Mister Suno Ek Baat" from Agra Road (1957), "Karo Na Phere Gali Ke Mere" from Bengali film Gali Theke Rajpath (1959) composed by Sudhin Dasgupta, "Naya Naya Chand Hai Jee" Khuda Ka Banda (1957) starring actor Chandrashekar and composed by S.N.Tripati. The song "Picnic Me Tick Tick" from Piya Milan Ki Aas (1961) composed by S.N.Tripati is noted for Dey yodeling and singing in a style which is known as forte of Kishore. With Lata Mangeshkar, Day recorded around 103 Hindi duets of which songs like "Tere Bina Aag Yeh Chandni" from Awara, "Yeh raat bhigi bhigi" and "Aaja Sanam Madhur Chandni Mein" from Chori Chori, "Pyar hua iqrar hua" from Shree 420, "Woh Chand Muskaye" from Akhri Dao (1958), "Ritu aye", "Dil Ki Girah Khol Do" from Raat Aur Din (1966), "Aya Abdulla Aya" from Juaari (1968), "Soch Ke Ye Gagan Jhume" from the flop film Jyoti (1969) and "main buddho lambo lambo" of Buddha Mil Gaya (1971) are still extremely popular.

1968–1991
Kishore Kumar and Dey had recorded only 6 songs together until 1968 and all proved to be hits, some of them being "Ye Duniya hai usaki nyari hai" from Sauraksha composed by Bappi Lahiri, "Ye Dosti humnai todenge" from Sholay, "Tubhi Piya Chikara Hoon" and "Tu Jaam Liye Jaa" from Bewakoof (1960), "Babu Samjho Ishaare" from Chalti Ka Naam Gaadi (1958) all three composed by S.D. Burman and "Baheta Pani Baheta Jaye" from Dhaake Ke Malmal composed by C. Ramachandra, "Joyo Joyo Mere Lal" composed by S.K. Pal in 1952 and their first duet together – "Subaho Ki Paheli Kiran" in 1951 from Andolan. In 1968, R.D. Burman brought them together for "Ek Chatur Naar" in Padosan. Reportedly the song "Ek Chatur Naar" (a duet by Kishore Kumar and Manna Dey) from Padosan (1965) was partly improvised by Kishore Kumar at the time of recording and Dey, determined to show Kishore Kumar how he would sing the duet better (since Kishore had not been trained classically), got into the mood of the song and immortalised "Ek Chatur Naar". Dey recorded around 31 songs with Kishore from 1951 to 1987 and all of them became chartbusters. From 1969, after release of Aradhana, the highest in demand playback singer was Kishore Kumar, so careers of Mukesh, Rafi and Dey were affected and they got lesser number of songs to sing. His peak period as a playback singer is considered to be from 1953 to 1969 and in the year 1969 it seemed that Dey's career in Hindi films would be over due to resurgence of Kishore Kumar but he had an extended peak period till 1976. The song "Tujhe Suraj Kahun Ya Chanda" from Ek Phool Do Mali in 1969, S.D. Burman composition "Mitwa Mitwa Piya Maine Kya Kiya" from Us Paar (1974) and his duet with Shailendra Singh from Bobby – "Na Maangoon Sona Chandi" were a chartbusters in respective years. His song "Sawan Ki Rimjhim Main" was aired in non-film program section in Vividh Bharati and became popular on the radio.

He received a fresh lease of life in his playback singing career from 1971 after Rajesh Khanna allowed music directors to picturise or feature songs sung by Dey in films with Khanna in lead role beginning with Anand, composed by Salil Chowdahry. For Rajesh Khanna, Dey had sung songs "Zindagi kaisi hai paheli" (Anand, 1971), "Tum bin jeewan kaisa jeewan" and "Bhor Aaye Gaya Andhera" (Bawarchi, 1972), "Nadiya Chale Re" (song sung with Rajesh and Dey), "Hasne ki chah ne kitna mujhe" (Avishkaar, 1973) and "Gori tori paijaniya" (Mehbooba, 1976). Later in a 2012 interview, Dey said, "I loved the way he picturised music. The success of a song depends upon how an actor picturises it. He was the number one in picturising songs. I will be ever indebted to him." From 1970 to 1983, he recorded around 503 songs used in Hindi films. Thereafter he became selective of the kinds of songs he sings and chose to do less work in Hindi.

The demand for Kishore-Dey combination only grew after 1972. Their popular songs were "Mere Pyale Mein" from Aamir Garib (1974), "Is Ishq Mein Har" from Mr. Romeo (1974), "Yeh Dosti" from Sholay (1975), "Duniya Me Jeeney" from Naukri, "Kamal Hain" from Karz, "Phool Chaahiye Na" from Pyas (1982) and their last duet was in 1986 film Maqqar – "Tu Hi Mera Sapna". Salil Chowdhry compositions rendered by Dey from films like Ananad and Anadatta became popular as well. Also the trio of Kishore-Rafi-Dey sang together hits like "Tujhme Ishwar, Allah Tujhme" from Nanha Farishta (1969) and "Band Mutthee" from Chalti Ka Naam Zindagi (1981). Kishore-Dey together also sang with Asha in many films and famous among them are "Khan Chacha" from Dil Deewana (1974), "Aa Kitni Sundar Jagah" from Chandi Sona, both composed by R.D. Burman and with Lata in "Goyakechu Nanche" from Manoranjan (1974), "Logo Ke Juban Me Apna" from Nehla Pe Dehla, both composed by Pancham.

Lata and Dey recorded fusion songs, which used both Indian and western instruments.  Several such songs included the duets "Kaanhaa Bole Naa" and "Balma Moraa Aanchaar" for the film Sangat, composed by Salil Chowdhury in 1975, which became very popular and was picturised on Rakesh Pandey and Kajri. The song "Neela peela hara gulabi" is a famous Holi song sung by Lata with Dey in Aap Bete (1976). In 1974, Dey sang along with Lata-Kishore in the song "Goyakechu Nanche" from Manoranjan (1974) which became a chartbuster in 1974. Dey continued to have hit Hindi songs to his credit from 1971 to 1986, such as "Dulhan Banungi" from Who Jo Hasina (1983), composed by Raamlaxman and sung with Lata, "Aankhon Ka Salaam Lo" with Lata-Rafi in Samraat, "Dilwaale Dilwaale" from Kranti (1981), "Yaari Hai Imaan" from Zanjeer, "Ye Duniya Hey Usi Ko" sung with Kishore-Usha from Suraksha (1979), "Tum Besahara Ho To Kisi" from Anurodh (1977), "Jo Likha Gaya Hai" from Umar Qaid (1975), among others. "Sab Kho Diya Sab Pa Liya" from Maqqar (1986), composed by Rajesh Roshan was the last duet of Lata-Dey for a Hindi film and was a chartbuster. He worked with composers like Laxmikant Pyarelal, Kamlyanji Anadji, Pancham, Bappi Lahiri, Raam Laxman, Sonik Omi, S. Rajeswar Rao, Ravi, Rajesh Roshan extensively from late 70s to 1990 in Hindi films. However, offers for him to sing solo songs in Hindi films reduced since 1976 gradually and rarely songs sung by him was picturised in the hero.

He sang "Bohey Nirontaro Ananto Anandadhara" from the album Rabindra Sudha in 1961, and then went on to sing 14 songs composed by Rabindranath Tagore until 2002 in Hindi. He sang title songs of Hindi serials like Hum Hindusthaani (1986), Khari Khari (1984), Aasmaan Se Oonchaa (1997) and Aao Jhoome Gaaye (2001), all composed by Barma Malik.

His first duet with Usha Khanna was "Janemon Janemon Tum Din Raat" from film Haye Mera Dil (1968), composed by Kalyanji Anandji. His first song with S. Janaki was "Itna Manta Tu Mera" from Aashiq C.I.D (1973) and with P. Susheela was "Joy Ho Gaanga Maiya Ki" from Gangaa Ki God Mein (1980). He recorded his first song with Vani Jayram, "Rataiya Baba, Rajania Baba" for the film Ratnaa Dakoo in 1972 and their other popular duets include "Mitwa More Man Mitwa" from the film Parinay (1974), composed by Jaidev. Dey also sang with singer/composer, Hemant Kumar (Hemanta Mukherjee), in Bengali movies, and also with some other Bengali composers like Nachiketa Ghosh and Sudhin Dasgupta. He sang a duet, "Ke Prothom Kachhe Esechi", with Lata Mangeshkar in the movie Sankhyabela. He also performed Rabindra Sangeet and recorded over 4000 songs till 2012. In addition to film songs, Dey released several albums of devotional songs of Jagadguru Shree Kripaluji Maharaj.

1992–2013

Since 1992, Dey withdrew himself from Hindi film music. But he continued to sing in Bengali movies, bhajans and gazals in different languages and appeared in live performances from 1992 to 2012. His last live performance was in 2012 in Mumbai. His last recorded song in Hindi films was for the film Umar in 2006 composed by Shamir Tandon, Duniyawaalo Kee Nahee Kuchh Bhee Khabar, which he sang along with Kavita Krishnamoorthy and Sonu Nigam. He was presented the Filmfare Life Time Achievement Award in 2011.

He sang duets with singers like Md Rafi, Mukesh, Sandhya Mukherjee, Mahendra Kapoor, Talat Mahmood, Amit Kumar, Shailendra Singh, Krishna Kalle, Shardha Rajan Iyengar, Arati Mukherjee, Chandrani Mukherjee, Anuradha Pudwal, Hemlata (singer), Minu Purushottom, Bhupinder Singh, K.J. Yesudas, P Jayachandran, Suresh Wadkar, Kavita Krishnamoorty, Alka Yagnik, Antara Chowdhury, Preeti Sagar, Dilraj Kaur, Yunus Fazmi, Jaspal Singh, Anwar, Manhar Udhas, Joginder and Mubarak Begum. He worked with more than 102 music directors in Hindi film industry from working with Krishna Chandra Dey in Tamanna in 1942 to music composer Shamir Tandon in 2006.

Personal life
In December 1953, Dey married Sulochana Kumaran. She was originally from Kannur, Kerala. Together they had two daughters – Shuroma Herekar (1956-2016), a U.S. based scientist and Shumita Dev (b. 1958), a Bangalore-based businesswoman. Sulochana died in Bengaluru in January 2012. She had been suffering from cancer for some time. After her death, Dey moved to Kalyan Nagar in Bengaluru after spending more than fifty years in Mumbai.

Death

On 8 June 2013, Dey was admitted to the ICU in a Bengaluru hospital after a chest infection gave rise to other complications. His health gradually improved and about a month later doctors took him off the ventilator support. Later, he was released from hospital.

He was hospitalized again in the first week of October 2013, and died of a cardiac arrest at 3:45 pm on 24 October at Narayana Hrudayalaya hospital in Bengaluru, aged 94. Musicians, politicians, cricketers and other notable persons issued statements on his death. He was cremated at Bengaluru itself.

Media

Dey's Bengali language autobiography, Jiboner Jalsaghorey, has been published by the renowned Ananda Publishers in the year 2005 which has been translated in English as Memories Come Alive, in Hindi as Yaden Jee Uthi and in Marathi as Jivanacha Jalasagarat.Jibaner Jalsaghore, a documentary on Dey's life, was released in 2008. Manna Dey Sangeet Academy is developing a complete archive on Manna Dey. In association with Rabindra Bharati University, Kolkata, the Manna Dey Music Archive has been developed in the Sangeet Bhawan.

He also lent his voice for Madhushala, composed by Harivansh Rai Bachchan.

Filmography
{{columns-list|colwidth=20em|Tamanna (1942)Ramrajya (1943)Jwar Bhata (1944)Kavita (1945)Mahakavi Kalidas (1944)Vikramaditya (1945)Prabhu Ka Ghar (1946)Valmiki (1946)Geetgobind  (1947)Ham bhi Insaan Hai (1948)Rambaan (1948)Awaara (1951)Andolan (1951)Rajput (1951)Jeevan Nauka (1952)Qurbani (1952)Parineeta (1953)Chitrangada (1953)Do Bigha Zamin (1953)Mahatma (1953)Boot Polish (1954)Baadban (1954)Mahatma Kabir (1954)Ramayan (1954)Shree 420 (1955)Seema (1955)Devdas (1955)Jai Mahadev (1955)Jhanak Jhanak Payal Baje (1955)Kundan (1955)Ek Din Ratre(1956)Chori Chori (1956)Do Aankhen Barah Haath (1957)Amar Singh Rathaur (1957)Jai Ambe (1957)Janam Janam Ke Phere (1957)Johnny Walker (1957)Laal Batti (1957)Miss India (1957)Narshi Bhagat (1957)Naya Zamana (1957)Pardesi (1957)Parvarish (1958)Amardeep  (1958)Post Box 999 (1958) Daak Harkara (1958) Anari (1959)Chacha Zindabad (1959)Deep Jwele Jaai (1959)Kavi Kalidas (1959)Navrang (1959)Ujala (1959)Madhu (1959)Manzil (1960)Angulimaal (1960)Anuradha (1960)Bambai ka Babu (1960)Barsaat Ki Raat (1960)Bewaqoof (1960)Jis Desh Mein Ganga Behti Hai (1960)Kala Bazar (1960)Kalpana (1960)Ganga (1960 film)Kabuliwala (1961)Main Shadi Karne Chala (1962)Baat Ek Raat Ki (1962)Dil Hi To Hai (1963)Rustam Sohrab (1963)Ustaadon Ke Ustaad (1963)
"Suhagan (1964)Chitralekha (1964)Waqt (1965)Bhoot Bungla (1965)Love in Tokyo (1966)Teesri Kasam (1966)Pyar Kiye Ja  (1966)Sankhyabela (1966)Subhash Chandra (1966) Upkaar (1967)Raat Aur Din (1967)Aamne Samne (1967)Palki (1967)Nawab SirajdoulaBoond Jo Ban Gaya Moti (1967)Antony Firingee (1967)Duniya Nachegi (1967)
Padosan (1968)
Mere Huzoor (1968)
Neel Kamal (1968)
Ram Aur Rahim (1968)
Baghini (1968 film)
Chowringhee (film) (1968) 
Ek Phool Do Mali (1969)
Chanda Aur Bijli (1969)
Chiradiner (1969) 
Jyoti (1969)
Pratham Kadam Phool (1969) 
Teen Bhubaner Pare (1969)
Pushpanjali (1970)
Nishi Padma (1970)
Mera Naam Joker (1970)
Bilambita Loy (1970)
Anand (1971)
Johar Mehmood in Hong Kong (1971)
Jane Anjane (1971)
Lal Patthar (1971)
Buddha Mil Gaya (1971)
Chhadmabeshi (1971)
Dhanyee Meye (1971) 
Anubhav (1972)
Paraya Dhan (1971)
Reshma Aur Shera (1971)
Durbar Gati Padma (1971)
Chemmeen (Malayalam)
Alo Amar Alo (1972) 
Har Mana Har (1972) 
Picnic (1972 film)
Stree (1972 film)
Bawarchi (1972)
Jeeban Rahasya (1972) 
Seeta Aur Geeta (1972)
Shor (1972)
Zindagi Zindagi (1972)
Avishkaar (1973)
Dil Ki Rahe (1973)
Hindustan Ki Kasam (1973)
Sampurna Ramayan (1973)
Saudagar (1973)
Zanjeer (1973)
Bobby (1973)
Basanta Bilap (1973) 
Marjina Abdulla (1973) 
 Dukh Bhanjan Tera Naam (1974) punjabi movie
Nellu (Malayalam) (1974)
Resham ki Dori (1974)
Us Paar (1974)
Mouchak(1974)
Fuleswari(1974)
Sholay (1975)
Himalaya Se Ooncha (1975)
Sanyasi (1975)
Ponga Pandit (1975)
Jai Santoshi Ma (1975)
Deewaar (1975)
Sanyasi Raja(1975)
Selaam Memsaheb (1975) 
Palanka (1975) 
Das Mnambati (1976)
Mehbooba (1976)
Harmonium (1976)
Hotel Snow Fox (1976)
Anurodh (1977)
Minoo (1977)
Satyam Shivam Sundaram (1978)
Jurmana (1978)
Ganadevata (1978)
Charmurti (1978) 
Dui Purush (1978 film)
Gautam Govinda   (1979)
Devdas (1979 film)
Heere Manik (1979) 
Abdullah (1980)
Choro Ki Baraat
Kranti
Karz (1980)
Dadar Kirti (1980)
Surya Sakkhi (1981) 
Laawaris (1981)
Indira (1983) 
Lalan Fakir (1987) 
Agaman (1988)
Prahaar (1990)
Guria (1997)
Umar (2006)
Sangat (unreleased)
}}

Awards

1965 Bengal Film Journalists' Association Award – Best Male Playback Award for Kanchan Jangha
1966 Ramon Magsaysay Award
1967 Bengal Film Journalists' Association Award – Best Male Playback Award for Sankhyabela
1968 Bengal Film Journalists' Association Award – Best Male Playback Award for Antony Firingi
1968 National Film Award for Best Male Playback Singer for the Hindi Film Mere Huzoor
1969 Bengal Film Journalists' Association Award – Best Male Playback Award (Hindi) for Mere Huzoor
1970 Bengal Film Journalists' Association Award – Best Male Playback Award for Chira Diner
1971 National Film Award for Best Male Playback Singer for the Bengali film Nishi Padma and Hindi film Mera Naam Joker
1971 Padma Shri by Government of India
1972 Filmfare Award for Best Male Playback Singer for Mera Naam Joker
1973 Bengal Film Journalists' Association Award – Best Male Playback Award for Stree
1979 Kalaimamani
1983 Tulsi Samman by Government of Madhya Pradesh
1985 Ordre des Arts et des Lettres awarded by Government of France
1985 Lata Mangeshkar Award awarded by Government of Madhya Pradesh
1988 Bengal Film Journalists' Association Award – Best Male Playback Award for Lalan Fakir
1988 Michale Sahittyo Puraskar awarded by Renaissance Sanskritik Parishad, Dhaka
1990 Shyamal Mitra Award by Mithun Fans Association
1991 Sangeet Swarnachurr Award awarded by Shree Khetra Kala Prakashika, Puri
1993 P.C.Chandra Award by P.C.Chandra Group & others
1994 Fukuoka Prize by Government of Japan
1995 Kalidas Samman by Government of Madhya Pradesh
1999 Kamala Devi Roy Award by Kamala Devi Group
1999 Zee Cine Award for Lifetime Achievement by Zee Group
2001 Anandalok Lifetime Award by the Anandabazar Group
2002 Special Jury Swaralaya Yesudas Award for outstanding performance in music
2003 Alauddin Khan Award by the Government of West Bengal
2004 National Award as Playback singer by Government of Kerala
2004 Hony D. Lit Award by the Rabindra Bharati University
2005 Lata Mangeshkar Award by Government of Maharashtra
2005 Padma Bhushan by the Government of India
2007 First Akshaya Mohanty Award by Government of Orissa
2007 Awarded the Dada Saheb Phalke Award by the Government of India
2008 Hony D. Lit Award by Jadavpur University
2011 Filmfare Lifetime Achievement Award
2011 Banga-Vibhushan by Government of West Bengal
2012 Annanyo Samman given by 24 Ghanta TV channel for his lifetime achievement.
2013 Conferred with Sangeet Maha Samman by Government of West Bengal.
2013 Deshikottama by Visva-Bharati(posthumously).
2015 Honorary D.Litt. by University of Cambridge(posthumously).

References
==References==

Further reading
 Autobiography in Bengali, Jeeboner Jalsaghorey, published by Ananda Publishers, Kolkata.
 Autobiography in English, Memories Come Alive, published by Penguin Books.
 Autobiography in Hindi, Yadein Jee Uthi, published by Penguin Books.
 Autobiography in Marathi "Jeeboner Jalsaghorey", published by Sahitya Prasar Academy, Nagpur.
 A biography of Sri Manna Dey in Bengali, Manna Dey Mannyoboreshu, by Dr Gautam Roy, published by Anjali Publishers, Kolkata.

External links

https://web.archive.org/web/20100108052343/http://www.bfjaawards.com/legacy/pastwin/196629.htm
https://web.archive.org/web/20100108052343/http://www.bfjaawards.com/legacy/pastwin/196629.htm 2 Manna Dey's songs in Malayalam – Publisher Malayalasangeetham.info
https://web.archive.org/web/20100106143248/http://www.bfjaawards.com/legacy/pastwin/196730.htm
https://web.archive.org/web/20100108050315/http://www.bfjaawards.com/legacy/pastwin/196831.htm
https://web.archive.org/web/20090218224447/http://www.bfjaawards.com/legacy/pastwin/196932.htm
https://web.archive.org/web/20100108033915/http://www.bfjaawards.com/legacy/pastwin/197033.htm
https://web.archive.org/web/20100109041555/http://www.bfjaawards.com/legacy/pastwin/197336.htm
https://web.archive.org/web/20100108095827/http://www.bfjaawards.com/legacy/pastwin/198851.htm
Manna Dey's profile in Malayalasangeetham.info
Manna Dey Sangeet Academy
 
"Being Manna Dey: The modest musical maestro" – IBNLive interview
"Manna Dey: A Rare Voice That Excelled In All Music Genres"

1919 births
2013 deaths
Bengali Hindus
Bollywood playback singers
Indian autobiographers
Indian male ghazal singers
Indian male playback singers
Indian memoirists
Filmfare Awards winners
Filmfare Lifetime Achievement Award winners
Recipients of the Padma Bhushan in arts
Recipients of the Padma Shri in arts
Scottish Church Collegiate School alumni
Scottish Church College alumni
Vidyasagar College alumni
University of Calcutta alumni
Dadasaheb Phalke Award recipients
Nepali-language singers from India
Marathi-language singers
Marathi playback singers
Singers from Kolkata
Male actors from Kolkata
20th-century Indian male actors
21st-century Indian male actors
20th-century Indian male classical singers
21st-century Indian male classical singers
Bengali singers
Best Male Playback Singer National Film Award winners
Music of Bengal